In mathematics, an exponential field is a field that has an extra operation on its elements which extends the usual idea of exponentiation.

Definition

A field is an algebraic structure composed of a set of elements, F, two binary operations, addition (+) such that F forms an abelian group with identity 0F and multiplication (·), such that F excluding 0F forms an abelian group under multiplication with identity 1F, and such that multiplication is distributive over addition, that is for any elements a, b, c in F, one has .  If there is also a function E that maps F into F, and such that for every a and b in F one has

then F is called an exponential field, and the function E is called an exponential function on F.  Thus an exponential function on a field is a homomorphism between the additive group of F and its multiplicative group.

Trivial exponential function 
There is a trivial exponential function on any field, namely the map that sends every element to the identity element of the field under multiplication.  Thus every field is trivially also an exponential field, so the cases of interest to mathematicians occur when the exponential function is non-trivial.

Exponential fields are sometimes required to have characteristic zero as the only exponential function on a field with nonzero characteristic is the trivial one.  To see this first note that for any element x in a field with characteristic p > 0,

Hence, taking into account the Frobenius endomorphism,

And so E(x) = 1 for every x.

Examples

Considering the ordered field R equipped with this function gives the ordered real exponential field, denoted .
 Any real number  gives an exponential function on R, where the map  satisfies the required properties.
 Analogously to the real exponential field, there is the complex exponential field, .
 Boris Zilber constructed an exponential field Kexp that, crucially, satisfies the equivalent formulation of Schanuel's conjecture with the field's exponential function.  It is conjectured that this exponential field is actually Cexp, and a proof of this fact would thus prove Schanuel's conjecture.

Exponential rings
The underlying set F may not be required to be a field but instead allowed to simply be a ring, R, and concurrently the exponential function is relaxed to be a homomorphism from the additive group in R to the multiplicative group of units in R.  The resulting object is called an exponential ring.

An example of an exponential ring with a nontrivial exponential function is the ring of integers Z equipped with the function E which takes the value +1 at even integers and −1 at odd integers, i.e., the function   This exponential function, and the trivial one, are the only two functions on Z that satisfy the conditions.

Open problems

Exponential fields are much-studied objects in model theory, occasionally providing a link between it and number theory as in the case of Zilber's work on Schanuel's conjecture.  It was proved in the 1990s that Rexp is model complete, a result known as Wilkie's theorem.  This result, when combined with Khovanskiĭ's theorem on pfaffian functions, proves that Rexp is also o-minimal. On the other hand, it is known that Cexp is not model complete.  The question of decidability is still unresolved.  Alfred Tarski posed the question of the decidability of Rexp and hence it is now known as Tarski's exponential function problem.  It is known that if the real version of Schanuel's conjecture is true then Rexp is decidable.

See also 
 Ordered exponential field

Notes

Model theory
Field (mathematics)
Algebraic structures